Sowin  is a settlement in the administrative district of Gmina Żytno, within Radomsko County, Łódź Voivodeship, in central Poland.

References

Villages in Radomsko County